A referendum on Émile Derlin Zinsou's candidacy for president was held in Dahomey on 28 July 1968. The results of the May 1968 presidential elections had been annulled due to low voter turnout. The military government appointed Zinsou to the position, but he accepted only on the condition that a referendum regarding his appointment be held. His candidacy was supported by 76% of voters, with a 73% turnout.

Results

References

Dahomey
Presidential elections in Benin
Presidential
Dahomey